The 1960 Paris–Roubaix was the 58th edition of the Paris–Roubaix cycle race and was held on 10 April 1960. The race started in Compiègne and finished in Roubaix. The race was won by Pino Cerami of the Peugeot team.

General classification

References

Paris–Roubaix
Paris-Roubaix
Paris-Roubaix
Paris-Roubaix
Paris-Roubaix